Sons of the Anzacs is a 1945 Australian documentary about the exploits of Australian soldiers during World War II.  It covered nine campaigns up until the fall of Lae.  It was later re-made and updated, in 1968, to cover the entire war.

See also
 Salamaua–Lae campaign

References

External links
 Sons of the Anzacs at Australian War Memorial

Australian documentary films
Documentary films about World War II
Films directed by Oliver Howes